B. R. Dionysius (born 1969) is an Australian poet, editor and educator. His poems have appeared in numerous national and international anthologies, journals, magazines, newspapers and other periodicals.

He was born in Dalby, Queensland. He was founding Director of the Queensland Poetry Festival and Director of Fringe Arts Collective Inc. a not-for-profit literary collective that organised the Brisbane Writers Fringe Festival (1993-1996) the Queensland Poetry Festival (1997-2001), The Arts Queensland Award for Unpublished Poetry (now the Val Vallis Award for Unpublished Poetry) published the poetry broadsheet, Seriously Fishy and coordinated literary events in Brisbane including Chalice Poets, With Baited Breath and The Word Made Flesh.

Dionysius completed an M.Phil. (Creative Writing) at the University of Queensland and a Bachelor of Education (Secondary) Grad Entry. He lives in Brisbane, Queensland, is married to the writer Melissa Ashley and has two daughters, Rhiannon and Sylvie, and a son, Theo.

In 1999, he was awarded a New Work Grant from the Literature Fund of the Australia Council to write the verse novel, Universal Andalusia. Universal Andalusia was shortlisted for the C. J. Dennis Prize for Poetry in 2006. He won the 2009 Max Harris Poetry Award. A chapbook, The Negativity Bin was published by PressPress in 2010. The Curious Noise of History was released by Picaro Press in 2011. He recently won the Whitmore Press Manuscript Prize, 2011.

Awards 

 Max Harris Poetry Award, 2009
 Whitmore Press Manuscript Prize, 2011

Bibliography 

 Fatherlands (2000)
 Bacchanalia (2002)
 Universal Andalusia (soi 3/papertiger media, 2006) 
 The negativity bin (2010)
 The curious noise of history: and other poems (2011)
 Bowra (2013)

References

External links 
 5 poems at www.thedrunkenboat.com

1969 births
Australian poets
Living people
People from Brisbane
People from the Darling Downs